Star Trek: New Earth is a series of interlinked novels inspired by Gene Roddenberry's original pitch for Star Trek: "Wagon train to the stars." Created by John J. Ordover, the novels follow the crew of the Enterprise as they escort a colonial expedition into a hostile region of unexplored space.

The novels occur during the second five-year mission, sometime between the episode "Turnabout Intruder" and Star Trek: The Motion Picture. The series was intended to be the springboard for a flagship new book line similar to Star Trek: New Frontier, called Star Trek: Challenger.

Production 
John J. Ordover told Jeff Ayers, in Voyages of Imagination (2006), the concept for New Earth originated as "a personal reaction to Voyager." He believed there was no stakes for those characters, no "emotional tie" to the region that ship was passing through. Ordover asked, “What if you went outside the known galaxy or outside the common area to find a new colony and you were assigned to stay there and protect them for a while?” His answer was the concept for New Earth.

Wagon Train to the Stars (2000) 
Star Trek: New EarthWagon Train to the Stars by Diane Carey, who also told Ayers that Ordover wanted a “new captain, new ship, new crew, and new situation, bringing Star Trek back to the original concept of ‘being out there’ with limited contact, essentially in a wild west town and having to fake it, hacking our way to civilization the hard way.” Carey and her husband, Greg Brodeur, developed the series concept. Carey wrote the first and sixth novels in the succession.

Belle Terre (2000) 
Star Trek: New EarthBelle Terre, the second novel, was to be written by Carey. However, Ordover recruited Dean Wesley Smith to complete the novel based on Carey's outline.

Rough Trails (2000) 
Star Trek: New EarthRough Trails, co-written by Julia Ecklar and Karen Rose Cercone as L.A. Graf, was inspired by the Johnstown Flood.

The Flaming Arrow (2000) 
Star Trek: New EarthThe Flaming Arrow was co-written by Jerry Oltion and with his wife Kathy. They found the experience of writing a multi-author series difficult, saying: “It felt like we were building a bridge between two shores that were both shrouded in fog, while trolls were busy knocking out the supports from under us. The last-minute changes kept rolling in, so we did the only prudent thing we could do: We finished our book first so everybody else would have to follow our lead from then on.”

Thin Air (2000) 
Star Trek: New EarthThin Air was co-written by husband-and-wife Kristine Kathryn Rusch and Dean Wesley Smith. Smith told Ayers, the novel was "a fun idea … foam covering a planet as a way to attack it." He also said he "had a blast" writing the developing and writing the novel.

Challenger (2000) 
Star Trek: New EarthChallenger was written as a possible introduction to a new book series. The namesake flagship was named in honor of the Space Shuttle Challenger by Ordover.

Chainmail (2001) 
Star Trek: ChallengerChainmail, by Diane Carey, is the second novel of the Gateways (2001) crossover series, and it was intended to be the introduction of a new flagship  series similar to New Frontier by Peter David. Chainmail is a direct sequel to Challenger (2000), and includes characters and settings from other New Earth novels. The novel is often erroneously cataloged as the seventh volume in the New Earth series. Only one Challenger novel has been published.

Reception 
Michelle Green of Little Review wrote, New Earth was "fun to read, with several compelling plots unfolding at once[,] and the original Enterprise crew having a lot of fun in between heroics."

Jeff Millward commented Challenger was, "a pretty good ending to an extremely long series." However, his wish was that "nobody writes a story that spans [six] novels again" after offering less enthusiastic reviews for the previous books in the series. Randall Landers of Orion Press praised Carey's abilities as a storyteller, in Challenger. But, he noted, Carey's "purple prose" limited the appeal of the novel.

Novels

Gateways miniseries 
Characters and settings from the New Earth appear in two entries of the Gateways crossover miniseries:

See also 
 List of Star Trek novels
 Star Trek: New Frontier

References

External links 
 
 

Book series introduced in 2000
New Earth
New Earth
Science fiction book series